Franz Schubert's Écossaises, D 421, are six short dances for solo piano:
 A major
 F minor (ends in A  major)
 E major
 A major
 B major
 D major (ends in B minor)

The pieces do not have tempo indications, and recordings have ranged from under 2 minutes to over 4 minutes in length for all six pieces.

Schubert wrote these Écossaises in May 1816 during a visit to Josef von Spaun's new home in the Landstraße suburb south-east of Vienna. During the visit, Schubert was locked into his room for a prank, which was that he was to finish a composition before being released. He produced these six Écossaises, and the following words were inscribed on the (now lost) title page: "Composed while confined to my room at Erdberg, May 1816."

References

External links 

Piano music by Franz Schubert
1816 compositions